Topi "Iron Ball" Helin (born November 21, 1978) is a retired Finnish professional Muay Thai kickboxer, four time Finnish Heavyweight Champion and amateur Muay Thai World Champion. In 2003 he turned pro and had his first tournament in K-1 Scandinavia 2005 in Stockholm, Sweden. He trained out of Turku Thaiboxing Club under his mentor and coach WMC World Champion Riku Immonen.

Martial arts
Helin trained Judo as a child around age of 5 or 6, but switched to Wado-ryu Karate at age of 13 and finally to Muay Thai at 15.

Titles
 2003 Amateur Muay Thai World Champion in Bangkok (-91 kg)
 2002 Kings Cup silver medalist
 2002 European Amateur Muay Thai Championships bronze medalist
 4 time Finnish Muay Thai Champion

Kickboxing record

See also
List of male kickboxers
List of K-1 events
K-1

External links
 Turku Thaiboxing Club
 K-1 official website
 Topi Helin's K-1 profile

References 

1978 births
Living people
Sportspeople from Turku
Finnish male kickboxers
Cruiserweight kickboxers
Heavyweight kickboxers
Finnish Muay Thai practitioners
Wadō-ryū practitioners